Manuel Cárdenas Fonseca (born 13 February 1958) is a Mexican politician from the New Alliance Party. From 2006 to 2009 he served as Deputy of the LVII and LX Legislatures of the Mexican Congress representing Sinaloa.

References

1958 births
Living people
Politicians from Sinaloa
People from Guasave
New Alliance Party (Mexico) politicians
21st-century Mexican politicians
Deputies of the LX Legislature of Mexico
Members of the Chamber of Deputies (Mexico) for Sinaloa